Mattia Florio (born 5 September 2003) is an Italian professional footballer, who plays for Hellas Verona as a forward.

Club career 
Having come through the youth ranks of Hellas Verona, Florio started training with the first team in 2021, under head coach Igor Tudor, and eventually made his professional debut on 15 December 2021, coming in as a substitute during the second half of the Coppa Italia tie against Empoli, which ended in a 3-4 defeat for his side.

Style of play 
Florio mainly acts as a shadow striker, but can also play in every other attacking position. A right-footed player, he has been regarded for his shooting skills, his acceleration and his passing.

Career statistics

Club

References

External links

2003 births
Living people
Italian footballers
Association football forwards
Footballers from Verona
Hellas Verona F.C. players